= Dodwad =

- Village
- Country: India
- State: Karnataka
- District: Belgaum

Government
  - Type: Panchayat raj
  - Body: Gram panchayat

Languages
  - Official: Kannada
- Time zone: UTC+5:30 (IST)
- Telephone code: 08288
- Nearest city: Bailhongal

Dodwad is a village in Belgaum district in the southern state of Karnataka, India.

Kittur Rani Chennamma (1778−1829) was the queen of the princely state of Kittur in Karnataka was ruler. She led an armed rebellion against the British in 1824, more than 3 decades before the 1857 war of independence. The resistance ended in her martyrdom and she is remembered as one of the earliest Indian rulers to have fought for independence. She is much venerated in Karnataka as an icon of bravery and women's pride.

Dodwad is a village situated 15 km from kittur, in Belgaum district in the northern state of Karnataka, India. Belgaum District has been divided into 10 talukas. Chikkodi taluka is the largest with an area of 1,995.70 km and Raybag taluka is the smallest with an area of 958.8 km. The district comprises three revenue sub-divisions and six police sub-divisions. Apart from the Belgaum City Corporation, there are 17 municipalities, 20 towns, 485 gram panchayats, 1,138 inhabited villages and 26 non-inhabited villages. Belgaum is also the headquarters of the Belgaum Revenue Division.

In 2011, there were 731 people in Dodwad (374 men, 357 women).
